Cattleya pumila, commonly known as the dwarf sophronitis, is a species of orchid endemic to southeastern and southern Brazil.

References

External links 

pumila
Endemic orchids of Brazil